The 2015 Women's Under 18 Australian Championships was the a field hockey tournament held in the South Australia city of Adelaide between 8–16 April 2015.

Queensland won the gold medal by defeating Victoria Blue 4–0 in the final. Western Australia won the bronze medal by defeating New South Wales 2–0 in the third and fourth place playoff.

Competition format
The tournament is divided into two pools, Pool A and Pool B, each consisting of five teams in a round robin format. Throughout the pool stage however, teams from each pool competed in crossover matches with the teams in the other pool, with each team playing one crossover match.

At the conclusion of the pool stage, the top two teams of Pools A and B progress through to the semi-finals, where the top placed teams of each pool compete against the second placed team of each pool, with the winners progressing to the final.

The bottom six teams then progress to Pool C, carrying over points from previous matches. Final rankings in Pool C determine final ranking overall.

Teams
Unlike other National Australian Championships, teams from New South Wales, Queensland and Victoria are eligible to enter two teams.

  ACT
  NSW State
  NSW Blue
  NT
  QLD
  SA
  TAS
  VIC Blue
  VIC White
  WA

Results

First round
Note: points from crossover matches have been added into the teams' respective pools, and dates and times of crossover matches has been bolded.

Pool A

Pool B

Second round
Note: results from previous crossover matches (including teams not in Pool C) were included in Pool C rankings.

Pool C (Classification Round)

First to fourth place classification

Semi-finals

Third and fourth place

Final

Statistics

Final standings

References

External links

2015
2015 in Australian women's field hockey